The Female Seminary in Centreville, Maryland was built c. 1876 as a public schoolhouse intended exclusively for women. The pressed-brick building was built in a restrained Victorian style, with two classrooms on each of two floors with a side passage.  Separate education lasted for thirty years, and in 1907 the building was sold and converted for residential use.

See also
Female seminaries
Women in education in the United States

References

External links
, including photo, at Maryland Historical Trust

Defunct schools in Maryland
History of women in Maryland
Houses on the National Register of Historic Places in Maryland
Houses in Queen Anne's County, Maryland
Female seminaries in the United States
National Register of Historic Places in Queen Anne's County, Maryland